Turbinelloidea is a superfamily of sea snails in the order Neogastropoda. It comprises the following families:

Columbariidae Tomlin, 1928
Costellariidae MacDonald, 1860
Ptychatractidae Stimpson, 1865
Turbinellidae Swainson, 1835
Volutomitridae Gray, 1854
Families brought into synonymy
 Cynodontidae MacDonald, 1860: synonym of Vasinae H. Adams & A. Adams, 1853 (1840)
 Vasidae H. Adams & A. Adams, 1853: synonym of Turbinellidae Swainson, 1835
 Vexillidae Thiele, 1929: synonym of Costellariidae MacDonald, 1860
 Xancidae Pilsbry, 1922: synonym of Turbinellidae Swainson, 1835

References

 Bouchet P., Rocroi J.P., Hausdorf B., Kaim A., Kano Y., Nützel A., Parkhaev P., Schrödl M. & Strong E.E. (2017). Revised classification, nomenclator and typification of gastropod and monoplacophoran families. Malacologia. 61(1-2): 1-526

External links
 Fedosov A.E., Puillandre N., Herrmann M., Dgebuadze P. & Bouchet P. (2017). Phylogeny, systematics, and evolution of the family Costellariidae (Gastropoda: Neogastropoda). Zoological Journal of the Linnean Society. 179(3): 541-626

 
Gastropod superfamilies